Laura Esther Galván Rodríguez (born 5 October 1991) is a Mexican long-distance runner. In 2019, she won the gold medal in the women's 5000 metres event at the 2019 Pan American Games held in Lima, Peru. She also competed in the women's 1500 metres event where she finished in 4th place. On 6 March 2021, Galván ran 4:08.14 setting a new Mexican 1500 m record outdoor track and field.

Personal Bests

See Also 

 Laura Galván Profile at World Athletics
 List of Mexican records in athletics

References

External links 
 

Living people
1991 births
Place of birth missing (living people)
Mexican female long-distance runners
Athletes (track and field) at the 2019 Pan American Games
Pan American Games medalists in athletics (track and field)
Pan American Games gold medalists for Mexico
Medalists at the 2019 Pan American Games
Athletes (track and field) at the 2020 Summer Olympics
Olympic athletes of Mexico
21st-century Mexican women